Calvin Elston Peterson (born October 6, 1952) is a former professional American football linebacker in the National Football League (NFL) for the Dallas Cowboys, Tampa Bay Buccaneers, Kansas City Chiefs and Los Angeles Raiders. He played college football at UCLA.

Early years
Peterson prepped at Los Angeles High School, before moving on to UCLA, where he played the "loose" defensive end position and was a three-year starter.

Professional career

Dallas Cowboys
Peterson was selected by the Dallas Cowboys in the third round (72nd overall) of the 1974 NFL Draft, with the intention of converting him to an outside linebacker. As a rookie, his speed allowed him to become a key special teams player.

In 1975, he was the fourth linebacker on the depth chart and was used on passing downs, on a team that played in Super Bowl X.

Tampa Bay Buccaneers
The Tampa Bay Buccaneers selected him from the Cowboys roster in the 1976 NFL Expansion Draft. He was a starter and considered the team's best linebacker, until suffering a sprained knee in the fourth game of the season. He returned in the eighth game to play against the Denver Broncos, but he reinjured his knee and was placed on the injured reserve list. He could never fully recover from his knee injury and was waived the next off-season after failing a physical.

Los Angeles Rams
Peterson signed with the Los Angeles Rams in 1978, but was waived before the start of the season.

Kansas City Chiefs
He signed with the Kansas City Chiefs for the 1979 season and went on to start thirteen games in the span of three years. 
In 1981, he started the season on the reserve non-football injured list after coming to training camp with a virus that limited him, but recovered to play in 11 games. He was waived before the start of the 1982 season.

Los Angeles Raiders
In 1982, he played for the Los Angeles Raiders and was active in 4 games.

References

1952 births
Living people
Los Angeles High School alumni
Players of American football from Los Angeles
American football linebackers
UCLA Bruins football players
Dallas Cowboys players
Tampa Bay Buccaneers players
Kansas City Chiefs players
Los Angeles Raiders players